KBEK (95.5 FM; "Nice 95.5") is a radio station licensed to Mora, Minnesota, and serving east-central Minnesota and northwestern Wisconsin. The station is owned by Alan R. Quarnstrom, through licensee Q Media Properties, LLC. KBEK previously aired an eclectic mix of music with specialty shows every night of the week, all hosted by personalities who live in the station's broadcast area.

History
The station was assigned the KBEK call letters by the Federal Communications Commission on September 20, 1989, and was granted its license to cover on May 22, 1995. It was formerly licensed to John Godfrey, Colleen McKinney's late husband, who died of cancer in 2004.

Due to economic factors, KBEK went up for sale in September 2011. It originally announced that it would close on September 30, 2011 (which was subsequently pushed to December 31, 2011) before McKinney announced on December 22 that KBEK had been sold and will remain on the air.

KBEK went off the air April 1, 2014.

KBEK turned its transmitter back on October 26, 2014 and resumed regular broadcasting shortly there after. McKinney sold KBEK to Genesis Technology Communication LLC effective December 1, 2017 at a price of $200,000.

In October 2020, it was announced that Alan R. Quarnstrom's Q Media Properties, LLC would acquire KBEK from Genesis Technology Communication LLC. Q Media would begin operating KBEK on November 1, 2020 via a local marketing agreement.

Soon after Q Media Properties began operating KBEK on November 1, KBEK began simulcasting soon-to-be sister station WCMP in Pine City, which broadcasts a classic hits format branded as "Highway 106.5." The simulcast would be temporary, as KBEK promoted a format change would be coming soon.

On November 16, 2020, KBEK changed to adult contemporary, branded as "Nice 95.5".

The purchase by Q Media Properties, at a price of $295,000, was consummated on October 8, 2021.

References

External links
An article referencing KBEK back on the air
KBEK official website
Brief narrative on John Godfrey, founder and former owner
ECM Post Review article on KBEK's 10th anniversary

Radio stations in Minnesota
Mainstream adult contemporary radio stations in the United States
Kanabec County, Minnesota
Radio stations established in 1995
1995 establishments in Minnesota